The Day the Bookies Wept is a 1939 American comedy film directed by Leslie Goodwins and written by Bert Granet and George Jeske. The film stars Joe Penner, Betty Grable, Richard Lane, Tom Kennedy and Thurston Hall. The film was released on September 15, 1939, by RKO Pictures.

Plot

Pooling their resources, New York City taxi drivers–who are tired of losing money at the racetrack–designate Ernie Ambrose to go to Kentucky and buy them a racehorse. Ernie leaves behind his sweetheart Ina and spends all their money on a horse, relying on advice from a fake "colonel" by buying a nag called Hiccup.

The horse is useless until Ina discovers via the colonel that Hiccup has a taste for beer. At long odds, she bets $2,000 on the drunken horse to win, which it does, bankrupting bookies all over town.

Cast 

 Joe Penner as Ernest 'Ernie' Ambrose
 Betty Grable as Ina Firpo
 Richard Lane as Ramsey Firpo
 Tom Kennedy as Pinky Brophy
 Thurston Hall as Colonel March
 Bernadene Hayes as Margie
 Carol Hughes as Patsy
 Vinton Hayworth as Harry
 Emory Parnell as Motor Cop

References

External links 
 
 
 
 

1939 films
American black-and-white films
RKO Pictures films
Films directed by Leslie Goodwins
American comedy films
1939 comedy films
1930s English-language films
1930s American films
English-language comedy films